Callomegachile is a subgenus of the bee genus Megachile in the family Megachilidae.

Species

 Megachile albobasalis
 Megachile alboscopacea
 Megachile ambigua
 Megachile anomomaculata
 Megachile antinorii
 Megachile apoicola
 Megachile ardens
 Megachile arnoldiella
 Megachile aterrima
 Megachile atratiformis
 Megachile badia
 Megachile bigibbosa
 Megachile bilobata
 Megachile binghami
 Megachile biroi
 Megachile biseta
 Megachile breviceps
 Megachile carinifrons
 Megachile cephalotes
 Megachile cheesmanae
 Megachile chrysorrhoea
 Megachile cincturata
 Megachile clio
 Megachile concolor
 Megachile davaonensis
 Megachile demeter
 Megachile devexa
 Megachile disjuncta
 Megachile disjunctiformis
 Megachile esora
 Megachile eurycephala
 Megachile eximia
 Megachile faceta
 Megachile facetula
 Megachile finschi
 Megachile flavipennis
 Megachile fulvipennis
 Megachile funeraria
 Megachile gigantea
 Megachile gigas
 Megachile godeffroyi
 Megachile hertlei
 Megachile impressa
 Megachile incisa
 Megachile indonesica
 Megachile ingens
 Megachile invenita
 Megachile kamerunensis
 Megachile kuehni
 Megachile laboriosa
 Megachile lateritia
 Megachile lerma
 Megachile leucospila
 Megachile luangwae
 Megachile luteiceps
 Megachile malayana
 Megachile mcnamarae
 Megachile mefistofelica
 Megachile memecylonae
 Megachile mendanae
 Megachile meneliki
 Megachile moelleri
 Megachile montibia
 Megachile monticola
 Megachile mortyana
 Megachile mystaceana
 Megachile nidulator
 Megachile nitidiscutata
 Megachile obrepta
 Megachile odontophora
 Megachile orthostoma
 Megachile osea
 Megachile paucipunctulata
 Megachile pluto
 Megachile pretiosa
 Megachile punctolineata
 Megachile ramakrishnae
 Megachile rambutwan
 Megachile rangii
 Megachile relata
 Megachile rhyssalus
 Megachile rotundiceps
 Megachile rufipennis
 Megachile rufipes
 Megachile rufiventris
 Megachile sculpturalis
 Megachile sheppardi
 Megachile simonyi
 Megachile soutpansbergensis
 Megachile stirostoma
 Megachile strupigera
 Megachile szentivanyi
 Megachile terminalis
 Megachile tertia
 Megachile timorensis
 Megachile tomentosa
 Megachile transiens
 Megachile truncaticeps
 Megachile trusanica
 Megachile umbripennis
 Megachile utra
 Megachile viridinitens

References

Megachile
Insect subgenera